Graeme Farrell (4 February 1943 – 25 July 2013) was an Australian cricketer. He played seven first-class matches for South Australia between 1966 and 1967.

See also
 List of South Australian representative cricketers

References

External links
 

1943 births
2013 deaths
Australian cricketers
South Australia cricketers
Cricketers from Adelaide